The 42nd FIS Nordic World Ski Championships were held from 24 February to 7 March 2021 in Oberstdorf, Germany. It was the third time that the World Championships have been held in Oberstdorf, having previously hosted the event in 1987 and 2005.

Russia doping ban
On 9 December 2019, the World Anti-Doping Agency (WADA) banned Russia from all international sport for a period of four years, after the Russian government was found to have tampered with laboratory data that it provided to WADA in January 2019 as a condition of the Russian Anti-Doping Agency being reinstated. As a result of the ban, WADA plans to allow individually cleared Russian athletes to take part in the 2021–2022 World Championships and 2022 Winter Olympics under a neutral banner, as instigated at the 2018 Winter Olympics, but they will not be permitted to compete in team sports. The title of the neutral banner has yet to be determined; WADA Compliance Review Committee head Jonathan Taylor stated that the IOC would not be able to use "Olympic Athletes from Russia" (OAR) as it did in 2018, emphasizing that neutral athletes cannot be portrayed as representing a specific country. Russia later filed an appeal to the Court of Arbitration for Sport (CAS) against the WADA decision. The Court of Arbitration for Sport, on review of Russia's appeal of its case from WADA, ruled on 17 December 2020 to reduce the penalty that WADA had placed. Instead of banning Russia from sporting events, the ruling allowed Russia to participate at the Olympics and other international events, but for a period of two years, the team cannot use the Russian name, flag, or anthem and must present themselves as "Neutral Athlete" or "Neutral Team". The ruling does allow for team uniforms to display "Russia" on the uniform as well as the use of the Russian flag colors within the uniform's design, although the name should be up to equal predominance as the "Neutral Athlete/Team" designation.

Schedule
All times are local (UTC+1).

Cross-country

Nordic combined

Ski jumping

Medal summary

Medal table

Cross-country skiing

Men

Women

Nordic combined

Men

Women

Ski jumping

Men

Women

Mixed

References

External links
Official website

FIS Nordic World Ski Championships 2021
FIS Nordic World Ski Championships
2021 in cross-country skiing
2021 in ski jumping
2021 in German sport
International sports competitions hosted by Germany
Nordic skiing competitions in Germany
February 2021 sports events in Germany
March 2021 sports events in Germany
Sports competitions in Oberstdorf